The Parti citron was a novelty political party that ran ten candidates in the 1994 Quebec provincial election, none of whom were elected. Information about these candidates may be found on this page.

Candidates

Labelle: Bruno Fortier
Bruno Fortier received 342 votes (1.28%), finishing third against Parti Québécois incumbent Jacques Léonard. He is not to be confused with another Bruno Fortier who later served as Quebec's envoy to New York City.

References

Candidates in Quebec provincial elections
Quebec 1994